The Yugo Florida, also known as Zastava Florida, Yugo Sana or Yugo Miami, is a five-door hatchback which was introduced by Yugoslav automaker Zastava on 19 February 1987, and remained in production until 2008. The Florida was designed by Giorgetto Giugiaro, and one group of engineers of Zastava at Italdesign. It has design similarities to Giugiaro's highly influential Fiat Uno supermini design, and also his design for the Mk1 SEAT Ibiza. Detail style is similar to his Renault 21 design.

The Florida was the most advanced and independently engineered automobile produced by Zastava before it stopped producing civilian automobiles in 2008.

It was sold in the United Kingdom from 1988 to 1992, badged as the Yugo Sana and available with a 1400 cc litre petrol engine and also with a 1700 cc diesel, both shared with the Fiat Tipo and supplied under licence from Fiat. It was eventually withdrawn from sale, due to its distributor, Zastava Cars (GB) Ltd of Reading going out of business as a consequence of the Yugoslav Wars and economic sanctions.

In 2001, many years after its debut in Europe, the Nasr badged Florida entered production in Helwan District in Cairo, Egypt by Nasr. Nasr's Florida is almost exactly the same as Zastava's Florida, except with a modified grille.

Background

The Zastava Florida was developed as the Zastava 103, and officially went on sale on 2 October 1988. The model was given the name "Florida" in order to celebrate the success of the Yugo in the United States. During its lifetime the Florida faced competition from the Romanian built Renault based Dacia Solenza and its successor Dacia Logan, and the Russian Lada 112, in the value for money compact family hatchback market.

Its main advantages were its versatility, its high technology compared to other Zastavas, and its price, never exceeding the EUR 7,000 figure for top of the range models. In 2000 a refreshed model of the Zastava Florida was revealed, originally called the Florida 103FL.

At the 2001 Belgrade Auto Show, it was shown with an "In" trim name added, so as to be called the "Zastava Florida In", and this is how it was marketed since. The Florida In L was the top-of-the-line trim, and offered air conditioning and radio. The price range was between EUR 5,000 and 7,000.

It was Zastava's most expensive car, before the introduction of the Zastava 10 at the 2006 Belgrade Motor Show. It was also available in flat bed pick up, panel van and ambulance format. After Zastava's brief fallout with Fiat, 1.1 and 1.6 litre Peugeot TU Series engines were installed, beginning in September 2002.

Zastava announced a diesel engined Florida in January 2007, which was a model which had been promised since before the original introduction, using Peugeot's  1.4 litre HDi engine. In the end, only 18 of these cars were built. In November 2008, the last Zastava Florida was produced in the factory in Kragujevac.

Gallery

References

External links
Zastava Florida 1.4HDi - Common rail Diesel
Zastava Florida 1.3CW KPG-CARTER WEBER 7Z2MRA carburator & Zastava Florida 1.6 In L KPG-Peugeot-Citroen engine-[ CNG fuel ]
Zastava Florida Sedan
Zastava Florida Caravan

Florida
Compact cars
Cars of Serbia
Cars of Egypt
Front-wheel-drive vehicles
Cars introduced in 1987
1990s cars
2000s cars
Cars discontinued in 2008